Zbigniew Ciesielski (1 October 1934 – 5 October 2020) was a Polish mathematician, specializing in functional analysis and probability theory.

Education and career 
Ciesielski was born in Gdynia, Poland. He received in 1960 his doctorate from the Adam Mickiewicz University in Poznan with dissertation  (On orthogonal developments of almost all functions in Wiener space) under the supervision of Władysław Orlicz.

He has been a professor at the Mathematical Institute of the Polish Academy of Sciences since 1969 and a member of the Academy since 1973. In 1974 he was an Invited Speaker of the International Congress of Mathematicians in Vancouver. He was president of the Polish Mathematical Society from 1981 to 1983.

Ciesielski's main areas of research are functional analysis, in particular Schauder bases in Banach spaces, and probability theory, in particular the mathematical theory of Brownian motion.

Awards and decorations

 1964: 
 1974: Order of Polonia Restituta: Knight's Cross 
 1984: Order of Polonia Restituta: Officer's Cross 
 1992: 
 1988:  of 1st degree
 2004: Honorary Member of the Polish Mathematical Society
 2014: Honorary degree of the University of Gdańsk

References

External links
 Zbigniew Ciesielski, Selected publications at the Polish Academy of Sciences

Functional analysts
Probability theorists
Members of the Polish Academy of Sciences
Polish mathematicians
1934 births
2020 deaths
Recipients of the Order of Polonia Restituta (1944–1989)
Recipients of the State Award Badge (Poland)